Kheyrgu (also Romanized as Kheyrgū; also known as Khargū) is a village in Kheyrgu Rural District, Alamarvdasht District, Lamerd County, Fars Province, Iran. At the 2006 census, its population was 1,051, in 215 families.

References 

Populated places in Lamerd County